Train is an American roots rock band from San Francisco.

Grammy Awards
The Grammy Awards are awarded annually by the National Academy of Recording Arts and Sciences. Train have been nominated for eight awards and won three.

!Ref
|-
| rowspan="5" style="text-align:center;"|2002
| rowspan="5" |"Drops of Jupiter (Tell Me)"
| Record of the Year
| 
|rowspan=3|
|-
| Song of the Year
| 
|-
| Best Rock Performance by a Duo or Group with Vocal
| 
|-
| Best Rock Song
| 
|
|-
| Best Instrumental Arrangement Accompanying Vocalist(s)
| 
|
|-
| rowspan="2" style="text-align:center;"|2004
| rowspan="2" |"Calling All Angels"
| Best Rock Performance by a Duo or Group with Vocal
| 
| rowspan=2|
|-
| Best Rock Song
| 
|-
| style="text-align:center;"|2011
||"Hey, Soul Sister" (Live)
| Best Pop Performance by a Duo or Group with Vocals
| 
|
|}

American Music Awards
The American Music Awards are determined by a poll of music buyers, and as a result is more of a representation of public opinion. Train have received three nominations.

!Ref
|-
| rowspan="2" style="text-align:center;"|2010
| rowspan="2" |Train
| Favorite Pop/Rock Band/Duo/Group
|
|rowspan=2|
|-
| Favorite Adult Contemporary Artist
|
|-
| style="text-align:center;"|2012
||Train
| Favorite Adult Contemporary Artist
|
|
|}

ARIA Music Awards
The ARIA Music Awards are awards celebrating the Australian music industry, put on by the Australian Recording Industry Association. Train has received one nomination. 

!Ref
|-
|2010
|Train
|Most Popular International Artist
|
|
|}

ASCAP Pop Music Awards
The American Society of Composers, Authors and Publishers annually honors the top performers in Pop music. Train has claimed one award. 

!Ref
|-
| style="text-align:center;"|2011
||"Hey, Soul Sister"
| Song of the Year
|
|
|}

Billboard Music Awards
The Billboard Music Awards are based on album and digital songs sales, streaming, radio airplay, touring and social engagement. Train has won two awards.

!Ref
|-
| rowspan="2"|2011
||Train
| Top Rock Artist
|
|rowspan=2|
|-
||"Hey, Soul Sister"
| Top Rock Song
|
|}

CMT Music Awards
The CMT Music Awards is a fan-voted awards show for country music videos and television performances. Train has been nominated once.

!Ref
|-
| style="text-align:center;"| 2011
|| "A Broken Wing" (with Martina McBride)
| CMT Performance of the Year
| 
|
|}

Danish Music Awards
The Danish Music Awards (DMA) is a Danish award show. The show has been arranged by IFPI since 1989, and was originally called IFPI-prisen ("IFPI-Award") until 1991, when it changed its name to Dansk Grammy ("Danish Grammy"). The current name was given in 2001, after the American Grammy Awards registered the name Grammy as their trademark. In 2011 IFPI joined together with TV2 (Denmark) and KODA to present the awards ceremony.

!Ref.
|-
| 2002
| "Drops of Jupiter (Tell Me)"
| Best International Hit
| 
|

Nickelodeon Kids Choice Awards
The Nickelodeon Kids' Choice Awards honors the year's biggest television, movie, and music acts as voted by Nickelodeon viewers. Train has received one nomination.

!Ref
|-
| style="text-align:center;"| 2011
||"Hey, Soul Sister"
| Favorite Song
| 
|
|}

Peoples Choice Awards
The People's Choice Awards are a venue for the American public to honor their favorite actors and actresses, musical performers, television shows, and motion pictures, and is voted on by the general public. Train has been nominated once. 

!Ref
|-
| style="text-align:center;"| 2013
|Train
|Favorite Band
|
|
|}

Radio Music Awards
The Radio Music Awards was an annual American award show that honored the year's most successful songs on mainstream radio. Train earned one award.

!Ref
|-
|2004
|Train
|Artist of the Year: Modern Adult
|
|
|}

Teen Choice Awards
The Teen Choice Awards honor the year's biggest achievements in music, film, sports, television, fashion, and more, voted by viewers aged 13 to 20. Train has received three nominations. 

!Ref
|-
|rowspan=3|2010
|Train
|Choice Music: Rock Artist
|
|
|-
|"Hey, Soul Sister"
|Choice Music: Rock Track
|
|rowspan=2|
|-
|Save Me, San Francisco
|Choice Music: Rock Album
|
|}

References

Train
Awards